Preetha Reddy is the vice chairperson of Apollo Hospitals, one of the largest healthcare conglomerates of India. In September 2012, she was elected to the board as independent director of medical technology company Medtronic.

Early life and education
Growing up, Reddy would visit her fathers hospital and observe his work. She obtained her Bachelor of Science degree in Chemistry from Madras University and master's degree in Public Administration from Annamalai University. She married her husband while in college and her father invited her to work at Apollo Hospital after her sister Shobana moved to Hyderabad.

She has three sisters, Suneeta Reddy, Sangita Reddy, and Shobana Kamineni, who are all serving as Directors in Apollo Hospitals. Their father, Prathap, founded Apollo in 1983 and the family still owns 34 percent of the company.

Career

Reddy joined Apollo Hospitals as a joint managing director in 1989, before being promoted to managing director. Under her direction, the hospital increased the number of beds it housed and helped Apollo Hospital gain its quality certification.

In 2012, Reddy was elected to the board as independent director of medical technology company Medtronic. Two years later, Reddy succeeded her father as executive vice-chairperson of Apollo Hospitals.

Awards and recognition 

 ET Awards' Businesswoman of The Year
 Healthcare Personality of the Year Award

References

Further reading 
 

1957 births
Living people
Businesspeople from Andhra Pradesh
Telugu people
Annamalai University alumni
Businesswomen from Andhra Pradesh
Indian businesspeople in the healthcare industry
Stella Maris College, Chennai alumni
Indian women business executives
Indian business executives
21st-century Indian businesswomen
21st-century Indian businesspeople